John McLeod Taylor (12 January 1913 – 5 May 1979) was a New Zealand rugby union player. He was a member of the New Zealand national side, the All Blacks, in 1937 and 1938. In all, he played nine matches for the All Blacks, including six internationals, scoring 45 points in all. After World War II, Taylor remained active in rugby as a coach, selector and administrator, including a period as Wellington coach, and later as chair of the Wellington Rugby Union management committee.

References

1913 births
1979 deaths
People from Mataura
New Zealand rugby union players
New Zealand international rugby union players
Otago rugby union players
Wellington rugby union players
Rugby union fullbacks
New Zealand rugby union coaches
New Zealand sports executives and administrators